Walter Schmidt (born 2 August 1937) is a German former professional footballer who played as a midfielder or defender.

Career
Walter Schmidt spent his entire professional career at Eintracht Braunschweig. He joined the club in 1959 and quickly became a regular in the Oberliga Nord, then the first tier of German football. In 1963 Eintracht Braunschweig became one of the founding members of the new nationwide Bundesliga. Schmidt, who missed only one league game between 1963 and 1967, was one of the key players of Eintracht's German championship winning team of 1967. However, an injury he suffered in 1969 forced Schmidt to retire from the game after missing the entire 1969–1970 season.

Personal life
Schmidt is the father of musician DJ Pari.

Honours
 Bundesliga champion: 1967.

Post-retirement
In 1966, while still playing in the Bundesliga, Schmidt began his teacher education and later worked as a teacher for sports, mathematics and geography.

References

Sources

External links
 

1937 births
Living people
Sportspeople from Bremerhaven
Association football defenders
Association football midfielders
German footballers
Germany B international footballers
Eintracht Braunschweig players
Bundesliga players
Footballers from Bremen (state)